A smartphone is a mobile phone with computer-like capabilities.

Smartphone, smartphones, etc. may also refer to:

 "Smartphone" (Cory Marks song)
 "SmartPhones" (Trey Songz song)